After Fallen Leaves is an album by American jazz saxophonist Roscoe Mitchell which was recorded in 1989 and released on the Swedish Silkheart label. Mitchell joined the Brus Trio for a tour of Sweden which culminated in this studio recording.

Reception

In his review for AllMusic, Brian Olewnick states "After Fallen Leaves isn't a bad album and it's always worth hearing Mitchell, but he has more than a dozen recordings under his name that should be heard first.."

The Penguin Guide to Jazz says that "There are many good moments without the session really making a coherent impact, since the trio seem eager but too unfamiliar with Mitchell's methods."

Track listing
All compositions by Roscoe Mitchell
 "Sing" – 15:22
 "A Lovely Day at the Point" – 4:40
 "The Reverend Frank Wright" – 7:04 
 "And Then There Was Peace" – 4:50
 "The Two Faces of Everett Sloane" – 3:29
 "After Fallen Leaves" – 7:59 
 "Mr. Freddie" – 4:33
 "Come Gathers Some Things" – 11:58
 "Play with the Whistler" – 7:26

Personnel
Roscoe Mitchell - flute, alto sax, tenor sax, soprano sax
 Arne Forsén – piano 
 Ulf Åkerhielm – bass
 Gilbert Matthews – drums, gongs, chimes, percussion

References

1992 albums
Roscoe Mitchell albums
Silkheart Records albums